Kennesaw Battlefield Park preserves a Civil War battleground of the Atlanta Campaign, and also contains Kennesaw Mountain. It is located at 900 Kennesaw Mountain Drive, between Marietta and Kennesaw, Georgia.  The name "Kennesaw" derives from the Cherokee Indian "Gah-nee-sah" meaning "cemetery" or burial ground. The area was designated as a U.S. historic district on October 15, 1966.

History 

The Battle of Kennesaw Mountain, fought here between Generals William Tecumseh Sherman of the Union army and Joseph E. Johnston of the Confederate army, took place between June 18, 1864, and July 2, 1864. Sherman's army consisted of 100,000 men, 254 cannons and 35,000 horses, while Johnston's army had only 50,000 men and 187 cannons.  Johnston had successfully contrived to block Sherman's advance with another defensive position, and this time Sherman tried a direct frontal assault.  Much of the battle took place not on Kennesaw Mountain itself, but on a spur of Little Kennesaw Mountain known now as Pigeon Hill, and the area to its south around Cheatham Hill.  A total of 5,350 soldiers died during the battle, which was deemed a Confederate victory, but Johnston's army nonetheless retired.

Park 

Established as Kennesaw Mountain National Battlefield Site on February 18, 1917, it was transferred from the War Department on August 10, 1933, and redesignated a national battlefield park on June 26, 1935. As with all historic areas administered by the National Park Service, the park was listed on the National Register of Historic Places on October 15, 1966.

Kennesaw Mountain Battlefield Park is a  National Battlefield that preserves a Civil War battleground of the Atlanta Campaign. There are three battlefield areas: In front of the Visitor Center, off Burnt Hickory Road and a major site at Cheatham Hill (commonly known as the Dead Angle). At the southern tip of the park, Peter Valentine Kolb's farm house, where a minor battle was fought, has been restored to its original condition. The Visitor Center contains an information desk, museum, and a theater which screens movies about the battle fought there. There are three monuments representing some of the states who fought here - Illinois, Texas, and Georgia. It is approximately a  gain in elevation from the Visitor Center to the mountain's summit.

Mission 

Kennesaw Mountain National Battlefield was authorized for protection by the U.S. War Department in 1917 and was transferred to the Department of the Interior as a unit of the National Park System in 1933. The  battlefield includes the site of some of the heaviest fighting of the Atlanta Campaign of the Civil War. The battlefield was set aside as an important cultural property dedicated to public inspiration and interpretation of the significant historic events that occurred here.

With the expansion of urban sprawl from nearby Atlanta, Georgia, concerns have been raised that the preserved areas of the park may be in danger from overuse and/or misuse.

References

External links
 
 Official NPS website: Kennesaw Mountain National Battlefield Park
 Kennesaw Mountain National Battlefield Park from About North Georgia
 Kennesaw Mountain National Battlefield Park timeline
A collection of Kennesaw Mountain memorabilia
 Atlanta, Georgia, a National Park Service Discover Our Shared Heritage Travel Itinerary

Battlefields of the Western Theater of the American Civil War
Protected areas of Cobb County, Georgia
National Battlefields and Military Parks of the United States
American Civil War museums in Georgia (U.S. state)
Museums in Cobb County, Georgia
Military and war museums in Georgia (U.S. state)
Protected areas established in 1917
National Park Service areas in Georgia (U.S. state)
Historic districts on the National Register of Historic Places in Georgia (U.S. state)
National Register of Historic Places in Cobb County, Georgia
Conflict sites on the National Register of Historic Places in Georgia (U.S. state)
American Civil War on the National Register of Historic Places
Parks on the National Register of Historic Places in Georgia (U.S. state)
1917 establishments in Georgia (U.S. state)